Metonymy is a figure of speech in which a concept is referred to by the name of something closely associated with that thing or concept.

Etymology

Background
Metonymy and related figures of speech are common in everyday speech and writing. Synecdoche and metalepsis are considered specific types of metonymy. Polysemy, the capacity for a word or phrase to have multiple meanings, sometimes results from relations of metonymy. Both metonymy and metaphor involve the substitution of one term for another. In metaphor, this substitution is based on some specific analogy between two things, whereas in metonymy the substitution is based on some understood association or contiguity.

American literary theorist Kenneth Burke considers metonymy as one of four "master tropes": metaphor, metonymy, synecdoche and irony. He discusses them in particular ways in his book A Grammar of Motives. Whereas Roman Jakobson argued that the fundamental dichotomy in trope was between metaphor and metonymy, Burke argues that the fundamental dichotomy is between irony and synecdoche, which he also describes as the dichotomy between dialectic and representation, or again between reduction and perspective.

In addition to its use in everyday speech, metonymy is a figure of speech in some poetry and in much rhetoric. Greek and Latin scholars of rhetoric made significant contributions to the study of metonymy.

Meaning relationships

Metonymy takes many different forms.

Synecdoche uses a part to refer to the whole, or the whole to refer to the part.

Metalepsis uses a familiar word or a phrase in a new context. For example, "lead foot" may describe a fast driver; lead is heavy, and a heavy foot on the accelerator causes a vehicle to go fast. The figure of speech is a "metonymy of a metonymy".

Many cases of polysemy originate as metonyms: for example, "chicken" means the meat as well as the animal; "crown" for the object, as well as the institution.

Metaphor and metonymy

Metonymy works by the contiguity (association) between two concepts, whereas the term "metaphor" is based upon their analogous similarity. When people use metonymy, they do not typically wish to transfer qualities from one referent to another as they do with metaphor. There is nothing press-like about reporters or crown-like about a monarch, but "the press" and "the crown" are both common metonyms.

Some uses of figurative language may be understood as both metonymy and metaphor; for example, the relationship between "a crown" and a "king" could be interpreted metaphorically (i.e., the king, like his gold crown, could be seemingly stiff yet ultimately malleable, over-ornate, and consistently immobile). However, in the phrase "lands belonging to the crown", the word "crown" is definitely a metonymy. The reason is that monarchs by and large indeed wear a crown, physically. In other words, there is a pre-existent link between "crown" and "monarchy". On the other hand, when Ghil'ad Zuckermann argues that the Israeli language is a "phoenicuckoo cross with some magpie characteristics", he is definitely using metaphors. There is no physical link between a language and a bird. The reason the metaphors "phoenix" and "cuckoo" are used is that on the one hand hybridic "Israeli" is based on Hebrew, which, like a phoenix, rises from the ashes; and on the other hand, hybridic "Israeli" is based on Yiddish, which like a cuckoo, lays its egg in the nest of another bird, tricking it to believe that it is its own egg. Furthermore, the metaphor "magpie" is employed because, according to Zuckermann, hybridic "Israeli" displays the characteristics of a magpie, "stealing" from languages such as Arabic and English.

Two examples using the term "fishing" help clarify the distinction. The phrase "to fish pearls" uses metonymy, drawing from "fishing" the idea of taking things from the ocean. What is carried across from "fishing fish" to "fishing pearls" is the domain of metonymy. In contrast, the metaphorical phrase "fishing for information" transfers the concept of fishing into a new domain. If someone is "fishing" for information, we do not imagine that the person is anywhere near the ocean; rather, we transpose elements of the action of fishing (waiting, hoping to catch something that cannot be seen, probing) into a new domain (a conversation). Thus, metaphor works by presenting a target set of meanings and using them to suggest a similarity between items, actions, or events in two domains, whereas metonymy calls up or references a specific domain (here, removing items from the sea).

Sometimes, metaphor and metonymy may both be at work in the same figure of speech, or one could interpret a phrase metaphorically or metonymically. For example, the phrase "lend me your ear" could be analyzed in a number of ways. One could imagine the following interpretations:

Analyze "ear" metonymically first – "ear" means "attention" (because people use ears to pay attention to each other's speech). Now, when we hear the phrase "Talk to him; you have his ear", it symbolizes he will listen to you or that he will pay attention to you. Another phrase "lending an ear (attention)", we stretch the base meaning of "lend" (to let someone borrow an object) to include the "lending" of non-material things (attention), but, beyond this slight extension of the verb, no metaphor is at work.
Imagine the whole phrase literally – imagine that the speaker literally borrows the listener's ear as a physical object (and the person's head with it). Then the speaker has temporary possession of the listener's ear, so the listener has granted the speaker temporary control over what the listener hears. The phrase "lend me your ear" is interpreted to metaphorically mean that the speaker wants the listener to grant the speaker temporary control over what the listener hears.
First, analyze the verb phrase "lend me your ear" metaphorically to mean "turn your ear in my direction," since it is known that, literally lending a body part is nonsensical. Then, analyze the motion of ears metonymically – we associate "turning ears" with "paying attention," which is what the speaker wants the listeners to do.

It is difficult to say which analysis above most closely represents the way a listener interprets the expression, and it is possible that different listeners analyse the phrase in different ways, or even in different ways at different times. Regardless, all three analyses yield the same interpretation. Thus, metaphor and metonymy, though different in their mechanism, work together seamlessly.

Examples

Here are some broad kinds of relationships where metonymy is frequently used:
Containment: When one thing contains another, it can frequently be used metonymically, as when "dish" is used to refer not to a plate but to the food it contains, or as when the name of a building is used to refer to the entity it contains, as when "the White House" or "the Pentagon" are used to refer to the Administration of the United States, or the U.S. Department of Defense, respectively.
A physical item, place, or body part used to refer to a related concept, such as "the bench" for the judicial profession, "stomach" or "belly" for appetite or hunger, "mouth" for speech, being "in diapers" for infancy, "palate" for taste, "the altar" or "the aisle" for marriage, "hand" for someone's responsibility for something ("he had a hand in it"), "head" or "brain" for mind or intelligence, or "nose" for concern about someone else's affairs, (as in "keep your nose out of my business"). A reference to Timbuktu, as in "from here to Timbuktu," usually means a place or idea is too far away or mysterious. Metonymy of objects or body parts for concepts is common in dreams.
Tools/instruments: Often a tool is used to signify the job it does or the person who does the job, as in the phrase "his Rolodex is long and valuable" (referring to the Rolodex instrument, which keeps contact business cards, meaning he has a lot of contacts and knows many people). Also "the press" (referring to the printing press), or as in the proverb, "The pen is mightier than the sword."
Product for process: This is a type of metonymy where the product of the activity stands for the activity itself. For example, in "The book is moving right along," the book refers to the process of writing or publishing.
Punctuation marks often stand metonymically for a meaning expressed by the punctuation mark. For example, "He's a big question mark to me" indicates that something is unknown. In the same way, 'period' can be used to emphasise that a point is concluded or not to be challenged.
Synecdoche: A part of something is often used for the whole, as when people refer to "head" of cattle or assistants are referred to as "hands." An example of this is the Canadian dollar, referred to as the loonie for the image of a bird on the one-dollar coin. United States one hundred-dollar bills are often referred to as "Bens", "Benjamins" or "Franklins" because they bear a portrait of Benjamin Franklin. Also, the whole of something is used for a part, as when people refer to a municipal employee as "the city" or police officers as "the law".
  Toponyms: A country's capital city or some location within the city is frequently used as a metonym for the country's government, such as Washington, D.C., in the United States; Ottawa in Canada; Rome in Italy; Paris in France; Tokyo in Japan; New Delhi in India; London in the United Kingdom; Moscow in Russia etc. Similarly, other important places, such as Wall Street, Madison Avenue, Silicon Valley, Hollywood, Vegas, and Detroit are commonly used to refer to the industries that are located there (finance, advertising, high technology, entertainment, gambling, and motor vehicles, respectively). Such usage may persist even when the industries in question have moved elsewhere, for example, Fleet Street continues to be used as a metonymy for the British national press, though many national publications are no longer headquartered on the street of that name.

Places and institutions
A place is often used as a metonym for a government or other official institutions, for example, Brussels for the institutions of the European Union, The Hague for the International Court of Justice or International Criminal Court, Nairobi for the government of Kenya, the Kremlin for the Russian presidency, Number 10 or Whitehall for the prime minister of the United Kingdom, the White House and Capitol Hill for the executive and legislative branches, respectively, of the United States federal government, or Foggy Bottom for the U.S. State Department. Other names of addresses or locations can become convenient shorthand names in international diplomacy, allowing commentators and insiders to refer impersonally and succinctly to foreign ministries with impressive and imposing names as (for example) the Quai d'Orsay, the Wilhelmstrasse, the Kremlin, and the Porte.

A place (or places) can represent an entire industry: for instance, Wall Street, used metonymically, can stand for the entire U.S. financial and corporate banking sector<ref name="gibbs jr.">{{cite book|last= Gibbs|first= Raymond W. Jr.|title= "Speaking and Thinking with Metonymy", in Pattern and Process: A Whiteheadian Perspective on Linguistics, ed. Klaus-Uwe Panther and Günter Radden|year= 1999|publisher= John Benjamins Publishing|location= Amsterdam|isbn= 978-9027223562|pages= 61–76|url= https://books.google.com/books?id=82R4CnbaQ0kC}}</ref> and  Hollywood -  for the U.S. film industry and the people associated with it. The High Street (of which there are over 5,000 in Britain) is a term commonly used to refer to the entire British retail sector. Common nouns and phrases can also be metonyms: "red tape" can stand for bureaucracy, whether or not that bureaucracy uses actual red tape to bind documents. In Commonwealth realms, The Crown is a metonym for the state in all its aspects.

In recent Israeli usage, the term "Balfour" came to refer to the Israeli Prime Minister's residence, located on Balfour Street in Jerusalem, to all the streets around it where demonstrations frequently take place, and also to the Prime Minister and his family who live in the residence.

Rhetoric in ancient history

Western culture studied poetic language and deemed it to be rhetoric. A. Al-Sharafi supports this concept in his book Textual Metonymy, "Greek rhetorical scholarship at one time became entirely poetic scholarship." Philosophers and rhetoricians thought that metaphors were the primary figurative language used in rhetoric.  Metaphors served as a better means to attract the audience's attention because the audience had to read between the lines in order to get an understanding of what the speaker was trying to say. Others did not think of metonymy as a good rhetorical method because metonymy did not involve symbolism. Al-Sharafi explains, "This is why they undermined practical and purely referential discourse because it was seen as banal and not containing anything new, strange or shocking."

Greek scholars contributed to the definition of metonymy. For example, Isocrates worked to define the difference between poetic language and non-poetic language by saying that, "Prose writers are handicapped in this regard because their discourse has to conform to the forms and terms used by the citizens and to those arguments which are precise and relevant to the subject-matter." In other words, Isocrates proposes here that metaphor is a distinctive feature of poetic language because it conveys the experience of the world afresh and provides a kind of defamiliarisation in the way the citizens perceive the world. Democritus described metonymy by saying, "Metonymy, that is the fact that words and meaning change."  Aristotle discussed different definitions of metaphor, regarding one type as what we know to be metonymy today.

Latin scholars also had an influence on metonymy. The treatise Rhetorica ad Herennium'' states metonymy as, "the figure which draws from an object closely akin or associated an expression suggesting the object meant, but not called by its own name." The author describes the process of metonymy to us saying that we first figure out what a word means. We then figure out that word's relationship with other words. We understand and then call the word by a name that it is associated with. "Perceived as such then metonymy will be a figure of speech in which there is a process of abstracting a relation of proximity between two words to the extent that one will be used in place of another." Cicero viewed metonymy as more of a stylish rhetorical method and described it as being based on words, but motivated by style.

Jakobson, structuralism and realism
Metonymy became important in French structuralism through the work of Roman Jakobson. In his 1956 essay "The Metaphoric and Metonymic Poles", Jakobson relates metonymy to the linguistic practice of [syntagmatic] combination and to the literary practice of realism. He explains:
The primacy of the metaphoric process in the literary schools of Romanticism and symbolism has been repeatedly acknowledged, but it is still insufficiently realized that it is the predominance of metonymy which underlies and actually predetermines the so-called 'realistic' trend, which belongs to an intermediary stage between the decline of Romanticism and the rise of symbolism and is opposed to both.  Following the path of contiguous relationships, the realistic author metonymically digresses from the plot to the atmosphere and from the characters to the setting in space and time.  He is fond of synecdochic details.  In the scene of Anna Karenina's suicide Tolstoy's artistic attention is focused on the heroine's handbag; and in War and Peace the synecdoches "hair on the upper lip" or "bare shoulders" are used by the same writer to stand for the female characters to whom these features belong.

Jakobson's theories were important for Claude Lévi-Strauss, Roland Barthes, Jacques Lacan, and others.

Dreams can use metonyms.

Metonyms and art

Metonyms can also be wordless. For example, Roman Jakobson argued that cubist art relied heavily on nonlinguistic metonyms, while surrealist art relied more on metaphors.

Lakoff and Turner argued that all words are metonyms: "Words stand for the concepts they express." Some artists have used actual words as metonyms in their paintings. For example, Miró's 1925 painting "Photo: This is the Color of My Dreams" has the word "photo" to represent the image of his dreams. This painting comes from a series of paintings called peintures-poésies (paintings-poems) which reflect Miró's interest in dreams and the subconscious and the relationship of words, images, and thoughts. Picasso, in his 1911 painting "Pipe Rack and Still Life on Table" inserts the word "Ocean" rather than painting an ocean: These paintings by Miró and Picasso are, in a sense, the reverse of a rebus: the word stands for the picture, instead of the picture standing for the word.

See also

 -onym
 Antonomasia
 Deferred reference
 Eggcorn
 Eponym
 Enthymeme
 Euphemism by comparison
 Generic trademark
 Kenning
 List of metonyms
 Meronymy
 Newspeak
 Pars pro toto
 Simile
 Slang
 Sobriquet
 Social stereotype
 Totum pro parte

References

Citations

Sources

Further reading 

 
 
 
 
 
 
 

 
Figures of speech
Narrative techniques
Rhetorical techniques
Semantics
Tropes by type